Coming Clean may refer to:
 "Coming Clean" (Green Day song)
 "Coming Clean", a song by Gigolo Aunts from Everybody Happy
"Coming Clean (play)"